Alexander Ruud Tveter (born 7 March 1991) is a Norwegian footballer who plays as a forward for Sandefjord.

He has previously played for Halmstads BK in Allsvenskan, Fredrikstad and Sarpsborg 08 in Tippeligaen and Follo.

Career
Ruud Tveter hails from Langhus and played for Langhus IL during his youth, where he was teammate with Etzaz Hussain. Ruud Tveter joined Follo in 2007 and was in December 2008 on a one-week trial with the German club VfB Stuttgart together with his teammate Edvard Skagestad. The 2010 season was a good season for Ruud Tveter; he played 29 matches and scored nine goals for Follo in the First Division and was a part of the Follo-team that played in the 2010 Norwegian Football Cup Final. Ruud Tveter joined Fredrikstad ahead of the 2011 season and signed a three-year contract with the club. Ruud Tveter started his first match in Tippeligaen and scored his first goal when Fredrikstad lost 2–1 against Stabæk on 25 April 2011.

After Fredrikstad loaned Henri Anier from Viking on the last day of the Norwegian winter transfer window, the club decided to let Ruud Tveter return his old club Follo, as his development had not been as the club expected, after a good first half season.

Ruud Tveter has represented Norway at youth level, and played two matches for the under-21 team in 2011.

Career statistics

Club

References

External links

 

1991 births
Living people
People from Akershus
People from Lørenskog
Norwegian footballers
Norway under-21 international footballers
Norwegian expatriate footballers
Follo FK players
Fredrikstad FK players
Strømmen IF players
Sarpsborg 08 FF players
Norwegian Second Division players
Norwegian First Division players
Eliteserien players
Allsvenskan players
Superettan players
Expatriate footballers in Sweden
Association football forwards
Sportspeople from Viken (county)